Banjarese cuisine is the cooking tradition and cuisine of Banjar people of South Kalimantan in Indonesia. Banjar cuisine also found in neighbor countries as following Brunei, Malaysia to Singapore.

Banjar cuisine has been influenced by many cultures, includes Malay, Javanese, Chinese and Indian cuisine.

One of the famous culinary of Banjar cuisine is soto banjar . Soto banjar has become one of Indonesia's special foods that are already very well known and recognized by many people. Soto banjar is served in many restaurants throughout the province. Soto banjar is a soto made from chicken meat as its main ingredient, then added with various spices such as onion, white onion, cumin, fennel, and cinnamon to make the soto more savoury. Additional juice from lime makes this dish even more fresh. This dish is usually served during lunchtime. 

Banjar cuisine generally includes soupy foods like sop ayam banjar. Unlike soto banjar, which uses ketupat, the chicken soup is served with steamed rice. The broth is made with spices like clove, star anise, nutmeg and ginger. Companions to this dish can include rice vermicelli, a sprinkle of fried shallots, a spring onion, and lime juice.

Ketupat kandangan banjar is a speciality of South Kalimantan which is usually associated with the Muslim holy day of Eid al-Fitr. It originated from Kandangan, South Hulu Sungai Regency. The food can usually be found around the Muslim holy month of Ramadan. What distinguishes this dish from the usual ketupat is that ketupat kandangan banjar use the tuna as its main ingredient. Sometime it would also use a baked cork fish and cooked with yellow coconut milk sauce. The spices used are from cinnamon, cloves, and cardamom. It tastes savory and is suitable for eating during the day or breakfast.

Kue bingka is a cake (kue) that unique to the Banjarese. It feels very sweet, fat, and soft. Bingka is one of the cakes used in the Banjar tradition to serve 41 types of cakes for special occasions such as weddings. Although it can be found throughout the year, bingka is usually common in Ramadan because it is considered suitable for breaking the fast. Bingka is made of flour, eggs, coconut milk, sugar and salt. As a rule, bingka is baked with floral prints. There are various kinds of bingka such as bingka tapai, bingka kentang, bingka labu, bingka pandan and so forth. In addition, there are other types of bingka which are common during Ramadan, namely bingka barandam which is actually quite different from the usual bingka. Aside from being a typical Banjarese dessert, bingka is also famous in neighboring provinces such as East Kalimantan and Central Kalimantan, even to foreign countries such as Malaysia and Brunei Darussalam.

List of Banjarese dishes
 Bingka, very sweet, fat, and soft cake (kue) made of flour, eggs, coconut milk, sugar and salt. It is usually served during Ramadan.
 Ketupat, rice dumpling made from rice packed inside a diamond-shaped container of woven palm leaf pouch.
 Ketupat kandangan, ketupat served with tuna or baked cork fish and cooked in yellow coconut milk sauce.
 Nasi kuning, fragrant rice dish cooked with coconut milk and turmeric. This rice dish has yellow color. 
 Pekasam, fermented food of freshwater fish fermented with salt, palm sugar, toasted rice grains and pieces of asam gelugur.
 Sop ayam, chicken soup consists of steamed rice and broth. The broth is made with spices like clove, star anise, nutmeg and ginger.
 Soto banjar, soto spiced with star anise, clove, lemongrass and sour hot sambal, served with

See also

Cuisine of Indonesia
Javanese cuisine
Malay cuisine

References

 
Indonesian cuisine-related lists